The 55 Division is an elite division of the Sri Lanka Army. A principal offensive division it is currently deployed for combat operations in the Jaffna Peninsula and is under the command of Security Forces Headquarters - Jaffna.

Current formation
55-1 Brigade
55-2 Brigade
55-3 Brigade

Sri Lankan Civil War

Towns captured by 55 Division

References

Sri Lanka Army divisions